High Speed UK (HSUK) is an advocacy group which proposes an alternative route to High Speed 2 that broadly incorporates the proposed Northern Powerhouse Rail (High Speed 3) scheme. Railway engineers Colin Elliff and Quentin Macdonald founded the group.

The HSUK proposal is not officially approved or funded by government. The scheme received a parliamentary hearing in 2015.

Proposed Routes

Dedicated High Speed Rail Corridors 
HSUK comprises 3 primary corridors of new high speed line construction:

 Following the corridor of the M1 motorway   from London via Leicester and Sheffield to Leeds, with links en route to Luton, Milton Keynes, Northampton, Birmingham and the West Midlands, Nottingham and Derby.

 Following the corridor of the abandoned Woodhead line and the M62 motorway   from Sheffield and Leeds to Manchester and Liverpool, with links en route to Stockport, Manchester Airport, Bolton, Preston, Blackpool, Warrington, Chester and North Wales.

 Following the corridor of the A1 and the East Coast Main Line   via York, Darlington, Newcastle, Edinburgh and Glasgow, with links en route to Teesside, Durham, Sunderland, Northumberland coast, Borders region, Edinburgh Airport and northern Scottish cities via the Forth Bridge and restoration/reconstruction of the abandoned Glenfarg and Strathmore routes.

West Midlands Upgrades focused upon Birmingham New Street

The new build routes listed above will be complemented by upgrade/4-tracking of all major radial routes into Birmingham New Street   i.e. Rugby-Coventry-Birmingham, Derby-Birmingham and Wolverhampton-Birmingham.

No new high speed line is proposed to directly link the West Midlands and the North-West. As the example of HS2 demonstrates, such a line would bypass all major communities between Birmingham and Manchester, including Wolverhampton, Stoke and Stockport.  HSUK has developed an alternative upgrade strategy focused upon Stoke and the wider Potteries region that will offer Birmingham-Stoke-Manchester services with a sub-1 hour journey time.

Here is a map of the proposed route (dedicated High-Speed Rail corridor only):

Comparison to HS2

Comparison to HS2 
The group highlights various points that they believe make it better than proposals for HS2. This includes:

 The cost of HSUK is £20 billion less than current plans for HS2 and HS3.
 94% of journeys are improved.
 40% less travel time on average.
 600 million tonnes of CO2 reduced.
 The Chilterns are avoided.
 Most work involves improving current infrastructure and restoring old lines, which is cheaper.
 The project is one that integrates new infrastructure with existing infrastructure.
All principal UK cities are connected.

References

External links
 HSUK official website

Proposed railway lines in England
Rail transport in Great Britain
High-speed rail in the United Kingdom
High-speed rail
High-speed rail by continent
High-speed rail in Europe